Recsk 1950-1953: The Story Of A Secret Concentration Camp In Communist Hungary, Hungarian: Recsk 1950-1953, egy titkos kényszermunkatábor története, - 1988 Hungarian documentary film directed by Lívia Gyarmathy and her husband Géza Böszörményi. Documentary tells the story of Recsk, Hungary's most notorious political prison camp, which operated between 1950 and 1953. During the early 1950s the very existence of this camp for political prisoners at Recsk was one of the Hungarian communist regime's deepest secrets.

This was the first Hungarian documentary about the political prison camps of the 1950s in Hungary, and helped prepare the ground for the so-called "system change", the end of socialism in Hungary. In the movie, director Lívia Gyarmathy interviews both old guards and prisoners of Recsk. The idea for the movie came from Géza Böszörményi, who himself was imprisoned in Recsk.

Awards and accolades

References

External links
 * 

1989 documentary films
1989 films
Hungarian documentary films
European Film Awards winners (films)